The 2009 UC Davis football team represented the University of California, Davis as a member of the Great West Conference (GWC) during the 2009 NCAA Division I FCS football season. Led by 17th-year head coach Bob Biggs, UC Davis compiled an overall record of 6–5 with a mark of 3–1 in conference play, winning the GWC title. The team was outscored by its opponents 300 to 272 for the season. The Aggies played home games at Aggie Stadium in Davis, California.

Schedule

References

UC Davis
UC Davis Aggies football seasons
Great West Conference football champion seasons
UC Davis Aggies football